The Mater Hospital is a 233-bed private hospital located in North Sydney, New South Wales, Australia. Originally founded in 1906 as a cottage hospital, and operated both as a public hospital and maternity hospital on an adjacent site in Wollstonecraft, New South Wales, between 1940 and 1982, the current hospital opened in 1990 and is now operated by St Vincent's Health.

History 
The hospital was established by the Sisters of Mercy in 1906 as the Mater Misericordiae Hospital for Women and Children with 12 beds and 12 cots on a site in Willoughby Road. In 1910, the sisters purchased and renovated ‘Wenona’, a large residence of a local bank manager on Lane Cove Road (now Pacific Highway), and by 1911 it functioned as a fully operational hospital.

A public Hospital, known as the "Mater General Hospital", was then erected and opened in 1914, adjacent to ‘Wenona’, whereupon the cottage hospital was closed and ‘Wenona’ then became the Mater Private Hospital. A major extension to the Mater Private Hospital was built on Sinclair Street Wollstonecraft in 1929.

An adjacent Mater Maternity Hospital was built between 1939 and 1940, and operated until the withdrawal of government funds in 1982. The Art Deco building remains as a local heritage item, the Former Mater Misericordiae Maternity Hospital.

The Public Hospital and Maternity Hospital were closed in 1982. A new (and the current) private hospital was reopened (as the Mater Hospital) on an adjacent site in Rocklands Road, North Sydney in 1990.

Notable people 

 Sister Justinian, born Mary May Scollen, was the matron at Mater from 1919 until 1963. She served for four years as the hospital administrator, from 1963 to 1967. She was appointed O.B.E. for her contributions in nursing.

References

Bibliography

Hospitals in Sydney
North Sydney, New South Wales
Wollstonecraft
Catholic hospitals in Oceania
Hospitals established in 1906
1906 establishments in Australia